In the afternoon of 24 November 2020, a 28-year-old Swiss woman attacked two female customers with a knife in the Manor store in Lugano, Ticino Canton, Switzerland. 

The perpetrator was stopped by intervening customers. One of the women who were attacked was injured seriously. The Federal Office of Police suspected the attack had an Islamist motive. The attacker was already known to Swiss authorities in connection with jihadism and sympathizing with the Islamic State. According to police she had previously tried to travel to Syria to fight for the group, but was arrested by Turkish security forces at the Syrian-Turkish border and sent back to Switzerland.

In 2022, the woman was formally indicted on charges of attempted murder. The prosecutors accused her of carrying out an Islamic extremist attack on behalf of ISIL.

See also 
 2020 Morges stabbing
 Terrorism in Switzerland

References

2020 crimes in Switzerland
2020 in Switzerland
History of Ticino
2020 stabbing
November 2020 crimes in Europe
November 2020 events in Switzerland
Stabbing attacks in 2020
Stabbing attacks in Switzerland